The Fiat AS.5 was an Italian 12-cylinder, liquid-cooled V engine designed and built in the late-1920s by Fiat especially for the 1929 Schneider Trophy air race.

Design and development
For the 1929 Schneider Trophy contest Fiat planned a new seaplane to counter the British challengers from Gloster and Supermarine. To minimise frontal area they chose a compact V-12 engine design that set new size standards for a 1,000-horsepower (750 kW) class engine. This unsupercharged engine had a high power-to-weight ratio due to the use of a high compression ratio and a special fuel blend containing a 50/50 mix of petrol and benzole.

A problem encountered with the AS.5 was that it developed maximum power at high crankshaft speeds (3,000 rpm) but lacked output gearing, so that great care had to be taken with the choice of propellers. The production version did feature a reduction gear. The AS.5 was developed into the AS.6, essentially a tandem-coupled combination of two AS.5 units.

Applications
Fiat C.29

Specifications (AS.5)

See also

References

Notes

Bibliography

Eves, Edward  The Schneider Trophy Story. Shrewsbury. Airlife Publishing Ltd., 2001. .
Gunston, Bill. World Encyclopedia of Aero Engines. Cambridge, England. Patrick Stephens Limited, 1989. 

AS.5
1920s aircraft piston engines